Bat Yam International Biennale of Landscape Urbanism, "Urban Action," is a design project in Bat Yam, Israel dedicated to examining and re-designing city landscapes and lifestyles.

History
The first Biennale, was "Hosting," held in 2008. This event was dedicated to expanding notions of hosting and hospitality beyond the home and into public spaces. 

In 2010, the city hosted its second International Biennale of Landscape Urbanism, "Timing." This Biennale was dedicated to exploring the ways urban landscapes are constantly shifting. The projects in the Biennale showed how these changes and disruptions, usually annoyances to citizens, can be used as opportunities for civic engagement and a way to create a better quality of life. 

Biennale projects accompanied existing municipal projects and catalyzed activity by local residents, entrepreneurs and municipal bodies to re-think existing city patterns. The event attracted tens of thousands of local and international guests to the 41 Biennale sites, the simultaneous street theater festival and the city’s diverse open spaces. The curators of Timing were Sigal Barnir, a lecturer at the Bezalel Academy of Art & Design in Jerusalem and Yael Moria-Klain, a professor of landscape architecture at the Technion – Israel Institute of Technology, Haifa.

References

External links

Bat Yam International Biennale of Landscape Urbanism

Urban design